Get-Rich-Quick Wallingford is a lost 1921 American silent comedy film directed by Frank Borzage. The film's script was adapted by writer Luther Reed from the 1910 Broadway play by George M. Cohan, which in turn was adapted from the novel Get-Rich-Quick Wallingford by George Randolph Chester. Produced by Cosmopolitan Productions and distributed by Paramount Pictures Corporation, the film was released in seven reels on December 4, 1921.

Get-Rich-Quick Wallingford was the film being shown at the Knickerbocker Theatre in Washington when that building collapsed, killing 98 people and injuring 133.

Plot
'Blackie' Daw arrives in the town of Battlesburg, Iowa. He has little money, but makes it known that J. Rufus Wallingford, a wealthy businessman, will be arriving in town soon and is interested in finding good investments. When Wallingford arrives, he and the townspeople hatch a scheme to build a factory, but they cannot decide what the factory should produce. Wallingford suggests carpet tacks, which he insists will interest other investors, and the townspeople agree. As time goes on, the company's stockholders begin to doubt Wallingford, who is, in fact, a con man. He is able to assuage their doubts. The establishment of the factory begins a real estate boom, and Wallingford and Daw are planning to skip town with the money they have made. But just before they do, a wealthy financier buys out Wallingford's interest and the factory makes a large sale of carpet tacks. As a result, Wallingford and Daw become wealthy by honest means. They both find women to marry, Wallingford to his stenographer Fannie Jasper and Daw to Dorothy Wells, daughter of a prominent town resident.

Cast
 Sam Hardy as J. Rufus Wallingford
 Norman Kerry as 'Blackie' Daw
 Doris Kenyon as Fannie Jasper
 Diana Allen as Gertrude Dempsey
 Edgar Nelson as Eddie Lamb
 Billie Dove as Dorothy Wells
 Mac Barnes as Andrea Dempsey
 William T. Hayes as G.W. Battles
 Horace James as Timothy Battles
 John Woodford as Mr. Wells
 Mrs. Charles Willard as Mrs. Dempsey
 Eugene Keith as Harkins
 William Carr as Quigg
 William Robyns as Abe Gunther
 Theodore Westman Jr. as the bellboy
 Patterson Dial as Bessie
 Jerry Sinclair as Judge Hampton
 Benny One as Wallingford’s valet

References

External links

1921 films
American silent feature films
American black-and-white films
1921 comedy films
Films directed by Frank Borzage
Lost American films
1920s business films
Silent American comedy films
American business films
1921 lost films
Lost comedy films
1920s American films